Cydia leucostoma, the tea flush worm, is a moth of the  family Tortricidae. It is found in India, Sri Lanka, Taiwan and Indonesia (Java and Brunei).

The wingspan is 11–15 mm. Adults are on wing from May to October.

The larvae feed on Camellia sinensis and wild tea. The larvae attack the tea plants, making tight rolls of the bud and top leaves of young shoots. Infestation affects both the yield and the quality of the tea.

External links
Eurasian Tortricidae

Grapholitini
Moths described in 1912
Moths of Japan
Tea diseases